Clystea stipata is a moth of the subfamily Arctiinae. It was described by Francis Walker in 1854. It is found in Pará, Brazil.

References

Clystea
Moths described in 1854